Thursday / Envy is a split EP by post-hardcore bands Thursday and Envy. It was released exclusively in a package containing the album on both 180 gram 12" vinyl and on CD — individual CDs or vinyl have not been made available. Three limited screen printed editions have been made available exclusively through web stores as of September 15, 2008. The album has since seen a limited release in cassette format, all 500 copies of which were sold exclusively through independent record label, Academy Fight Song's web store.

Track listing

Side A: Thursday 
All songs written by Thursday.
 "As He Climbed the Dark Mountain" – 3:03
 "In Silence" – 4:42
 "An Absurd and Unrealistic Dream of Peace" – 4:13
 "Appeared and Was Gone" (Remix of "In Silence" by Anthony Molina of Mercury Rev) – 5:59

Side B: Envy 
All songs written by Envy, except for track 1 written by Shido from Metalpark and Envy.
 "An Umbrella Fallen into Fiction" – 6:28
 "Isolation of a Light Source" – 3:40
 "Pure Birth and Loneliness" – 5:40

Personnel

Thursday 
Geoff Rickly – vocals
Tom Keeley – guitar, vocals
Steve Pedulla – guitar, vocals
Tim Payne – bass guitar
Tucker Rule – drums
Andrew Everding – keyboards, synthesizers, vocals
Produced and mixed by Tim Giles
Assisted mixing by Matt Messenger
Recorded by Kevin Neaton
Mastered by Alan Douches

Envy 
Tetsuya Fukagawa – vocals, sequencer
Nobukata Kawai – guitar
Masahiro Tobita – guitar
Manabu Nakagawa – bass guitar
Dairoku Seki – drums
Recorded and mixed by Takashi "Patch" Kitaguchi
Mastered by Tucky

Album personnel 
Vinyl mastered by Paul Gold
Art direction, design, and layout by Jeremy deVine
Illustrations by Dan Grzeca

References 

Thursday (band) albums
Envy (band) albums
2008 EPs
Split EPs